Berghem is a residential area in Umeå, Sweden.

External links
Berghem at Umeå Municipality

Umeå